"Sing for Your Supper" is an American popular song by composer Richard Rodgers and lyricist Lorenz Hart. The song debuted in their 1938 Broadway musical The Boys from Syracuse where it was done as a trio, with Muriel Angelus, Marcy Westcott, and Wynn Murray performing an arrangement specially created for the production by Hugh Martin.

Background
The lyrics describe a singer performing to earn her meals: "Sing for your supper, /And you'll get breakfast./Songbirds always eat/If their song is sweet to hear."

Recordings
The song has been recorded by: 
Benny Goodman & His Orchestra (vcl. by Martha Tilton 1938)
Rudy Vallée
Count Basie
Mel Tormé
Helen Humes
the Mamas & the Papas included it on their 1967 LP, Deliver
Also in 1967, Cher included it on With Love, Chér

Popular culture
Author Ethan Mordden used the title for his book Sing for Your Supper: the Broadway Musical in the 1930s.

References

1930s jazz standards
1938 songs
Songs with music by Richard Rodgers
Songs with lyrics by Lorenz Hart
Songs from Rodgers and Hart musicals